Mary Eliza Bakewell Gaunt (20 February 1861 – 19 January 1942) was an Australian novelist and writer. born in Chiltern, Victoria. She also wrote collections of short stories, novellas, autobiographies, and non-fiction. She published her first novel Dave's Sweetheart in 1894. Gaunt visited many countries in her life and she wrote about her experiences in five travel books.

Early life and education 
Mary was the elder daughter of William Henry Gaunt, a Victorian county court judge and Elizabeth Gaunt, née Palmer (c. 1835–1922), and was born in Chiltern, Victoria. She was educated at Grenville College, Ballarat and the University of Melbourne, being one of the first two women students to be admitted there.

Career
She began writing for the press and in 1894 published her first novel Dave's Sweetheart. In the same year she married Dr Hubert Lindsay Miller (a widower) of Warrnambool, Victoria. He died in 1900, and, with only a small income, Gaunt (now also known as Mrs Mary Miller) went to London intending to earn a living by her writing. Gaunt left Melbourne on 15 March 1901 and never returned.

Gaunt had difficulties at first but eventually established herself, and was able to travel in the West Indies, in West Africa, and in China and other parts of the East. Her experiences were recorded in five pleasantly written travel books: Alone in West Africa (1912), A Woman in China (1914), A Broken Journey (1919), Where the Twain Meet (1922), Reflection - in Jamaica (1932). In 1929 she also published George Washington and the Men Who Made the American Revolution. Between 1895 and 1934, 16 novels or collections of short stories were published, mostly with love and adventure interests. Three other novels were written in collaboration with John Ridgwell Essex. A collection of interviews with Mary were published in the 1925 Girls' Own Annual under the headings "Pioneering for Women" parts I, II, and III, and "Strange Journeys I Have Made".

From the early 1920s, Gaunt lived mostly at Bordighera, Italy. In 1940 she fled Italy and died at Cannes in 1942. She had no children.

She had a sister Lucy, and brothers Cecil, Clive, Guy and Ernest; Guy and Ernest were both admirals of the Royal Navy, and Guy later became a Conservative Member of Parliament.

Bibliography

Novels 
 Dave's Sweetheart (1894)
 Kirkham's Find (1897)
 Deadman's: An Australian Story (1898)
 Mistress Betty Carew (1903)
 The Arm of the Leopard: A West African Story (1904) [with John Ridgwell Essex]
 Fools Rush In (1906) [with John Ridgwell Essex]
 The Silent Ones (1909) [with John Ridgwell Essex]
 The Mummy Moves (1910)
 The Uncounted Cost (1910)
 Every Man's Desire (1913)
 A Wind from the Wilderness (1919)
 As the Whirlwind Passeth (1923)
 The Forbidden Town (1926)
 Saul's Daughter (1927)
 The Lawless Frontier (1929)
 Joan of the Pilchard (1930)
 Harmony: A Tale of the Old Slave Days of Jamaica (1933)
 Worlds Away (1934)

Novellas 
 Bingley's Gap (1888)
 Down in the World (1893)
 The Other Man (1894)

Short story collections 
 The Moving Finger (1895)
 The Ends of the Earth : Stories (1915)
 The Surrender and Other Happenings (1920)
 Life at Deadman's : Stories of Colonial Victoria (2001)

Autobiography 
 Alone in West Africa (1912)
 A Woman in China (1914)
 A Broken Journey: Wanderings from the Hoang-Ho to Saghalien (1919)

Non-fiction 
 Where the Twain Meet (1922) - travel
 Peeps at Great Men : George Washington and the Men Who Made the American Revolution (1929) - children's
 Reflection in Jamaica (1932) - travel

Notes and references

Sources
E. Archer, 'Gaunt, Mary Eliza Bakewell (1861 - 1942)', Australian Dictionary of Biography, Volume 8, MUP, 1981, pp 632–633. Retrieved 30 October 2008

Auslit Gaunt, Mary  (birth name: Gaunt, Mary Eliza Bakewell ) (a.k.a. Miller, Mary )

External links

 
 Works by Mary Gaunt at Project Gutenberg Australia
 

1861 births
1942 deaths
19th-century Australian novelists
20th-century Australian novelists
Australian women novelists
Australian travel writers
Women travel writers
19th-century Australian women writers
20th-century Australian women writers